The term Polish 1st Infantry Division might refer to three distinct infantry units of the Polish Army, fighting during various stages of the World War II or during World War I

 Polish 1st Legions Infantry Division, formed out of the Polish Legions in World War I and fighting in the Polish-Bolshevik War and Invasion of Poland of 1939
 Polish 1st Tadeusz Kościuszko Infantry Division, formed by Zygmunt Berling in the USSR and fighting alongside the Red Army on the eastern front of World War II
 Polish 1st Rifleman Division formed in France in 1918, from 1919 known as the Polish 13th Infantry Division

See also 
1st Grenadiers Division (Poland)
1st Armoured Division (Poland)